Eric Paul Allman (born September 2, 1955) is an American computer programmer who  developed sendmail and its precursor delivermail in the late 1970s and early 1980s at UC Berkeley. In 1998, Allman and Greg Olson co-founded the company Sendmail, Inc.

Education and training
Born in El Cerrito, California, Allman knew from an early age that he wanted to work in computing, breaking into his high school's mainframe and later using the UC Berkeley computing center for his computing needs. In 1973, he entered UC Berkeley, just as the Unix operating system began to become popular in academic circles.  He earned B.S. and M.S. degrees from UC Berkeley in 1977 and 1980 respectively.

Sendmail and Syslog
As the Unix source code was available at Berkeley, the local hackers quickly made many extensions to the AT&T code. One such extension was delivermail, which in 1981 turned into sendmail.  As an MTA, it was designed to deliver email over the still relatively small (as compared to today's Internet) ARPANET, which consisted of many smaller networks with vastly differing formats for e-mail headers.

Sendmail soon became an important part of  the Berkeley Software Distribution (BSD) and it used to be the most widely used MTA on Unix based systems, despite its somewhat complex configuration syntax and frequent abuse by Internet telemarketing firms. In 1998, Allman and Greg Olson founded Sendmail, Inc., headquartered in Emeryville, California, to do proprietary work on improving sendmail.

The logging format used by the MTA, known as syslog, was at first used solely by sendmail, but eventually became an unofficial standard format used by other unrelated programs for logging.

Other contributions
Allman is credited with popularizing the Allman indent style, also known as BSD indent style. He ported a Fortran version of Super Star Trek to the C programming language, which later became BSD Trek, and is still included in various Linux distributions as part of the classic bsdgames package.

He was awarded the Telluride Tech Festival Award of Technology in August, 2006 in Telluride, Colorado, and in 2009 he was recognized as a Distinguished Engineer by the Association for Computing Machinery. In April 2014 he was inducted into the Internet Hall of Fame.

Personal life
Allman, who is openly gay, lives in Berkeley, California, with Marshall Kirk McKusick, who had been his partner for more than 30 years before they married in October 2013. McKusick is a lead developer of BSD; the two first met in graduate school.

References

External links 
 Homepage as of 2010-10-29
 Linkedin.com profile
 Former homepage at Berkeley
 
 You've got Sendmail, Salon article about sendmail going commercial (December 1998)
 Biography at Sendmail.com (see "Chief Science Officer")

American computer programmers
Free software programmers
UC Berkeley College of Engineering alumni
People from Berkeley, California
Unix people
LGBT people from California
1955 births
Living people